Melsheimer is a surname. Notable people with the surname include:

Ernst Melsheimer (1897–1960), German lawyer
Frederick Valentine Melsheimer (1749–1814), American entomologist and Lutheran clergyman 
Frederick Ernst Melsheimer (1782–1873), American entomologist
Thomas M. Melsheimer, American lawyer and managing partner of Winston & Strawn LLP's Dallas office

See also 
Melsheimer FM-1, is an American single-seat, high-wing, FAI Open Class glider